Local elections was held in the Province of Laguna on May 13, 2019 as part of the 2019 Philippine general election. Voters  selected candidates for all local positions: a town mayor, vice mayor and town council, as well as members of the Sangguniang Panlalawigan, the vice-governor, governor and representatives for the four districts of Laguna, including Biñan lone district and the newly created Calamba lone district.

Provincial election

Candidates

Governor
Incumbent Governor Ramil Hernandez is running for his second term against his main rival in 2016 elections, former governor ER Ejercito.

Vice Governor

Congressional Elections

1st District
Incumbent Arlene Arcillas ran for Mayor of Santa Rosa. Her party nominated incumbent Santa Rosa Mayor Dan Fernandez and ran unopposed.

2nd District
Incumbent Joaquin Chipeco, Jr. ran in the newly-created Lone District of Calamba. Ran for the position are former Euro general Jaime Caringal, former PAGCOR chief Efraim Genuino, former Cabuyao Mayor Isidro Hemedes, Jr., incumbent Board Member Ruth Mariano-Hernandez, Tirso Lavinia, and retired district judge Rosauro Revilla.

3rd District

4th District

Biñan

Calamba
Joaquin Chipeco, Jr. from the 2nd District ran for the new seat unopposed.

Provincial Board Members

1st District
Cities: Biñan, Santa Rosa City, San Pedro City

2nd District
Cities: Cabuyao, Calamba
Municipalities: Bay, Los Baños

3rd District
Cities: San Pablo City
Municipalities: Alaminos, Calauan, Liliw. Nagcarlan, Rizal, Victoria

4th District
Municipalities: Cavinti, Famy, Kalayaan, Luisiana, Lumban, Mabitac, Magdalena, Majayjay, Paete, Pagsanjan, Pakil, Pangil, Pila, Santa Cruz, Santa Maria, Siniloan

City and municipal elections
All municipalities of Laguna, Biñan, Cabuyao, Calamba, San Pablo City, San Pedro City and Santa Rosa City elected a mayor and a vice-mayor this election. The candidates for mayor and vice mayor with the highest number of votes wins the seat; they are voted separately, therefore, they may be of different parties when elected. Below is the list of mayoralty candidates of each city and municipalities per district.

1st District
Cities: San Pedro City, Santa Rosa City

San Pedro City
Incumbent Lourdes Cataquiz ran for reelection. Her opponent was incumbent Vice Mayor Iryne Vierneza.

Incumbent Iryne Vierneza ran for Mayor. Her party nominated Art Joseph Francis Mercado, nephew of former 1-UTAK Party list Representative Homer Mercado and son of JAM Transit operator Alita Mercado. His opponent was Delio Hatulan.

Santa Rosa City

Incumbent Dan Fernandez ran for Congress. His party nominated incumbent Congresswoman Arlene Arcillas.

Incumbent Arnold Arcillas ran for reelection.

2nd District
City: Cabuyao
Municipality: Bay, Los Baños

Cabuyao
Incumbent Rommel Gecolea ran for reelection

Incumbent Jose Benso Aguillo ran for reelection.

Bay

Los Baños

3rd District
City: San Pablo City
Municipality: Alaminos, Calauan, Liliw. Nagcarlan, Rizal, Victoria

San Pablo City
Incumbent Amben Amante ran reelection for his 3rd and last term for mayor his opponent is former councilor Arsenio Escudero, Jr.

Incumbent Angie Yang her term is limited and now is running for councilor her party nominee is incumbent councilor
Justin Colago running this place his opponent is Brgy. Sto Angel Chairman Cesarito Ticzon and Atty/Dr. Emmanuel Loyola

Alaminos

Calauan

Liliw

Nagcarlan

Rizal

Victoria

4th District
Municipality: Cavinti, Famy, Kalayaan, Luisiana, Lumban, Mabitac, Magdalena, Majayjay, Paete, Pagsanjan, Pakil, Pangil, Pila, Santa Cruz, Santa Maria, Siniloan

Cavinti

Famy

Kalayaan

Luisiana

Lumban

Mabitac

Magdalena

Majayjay

Paete

Pagsanjan

Pakil

Pangil
Incumbent Mayor Oscar Rafanan of sought reelection against, former Mayor Jovito Reyes, Alfredo Acaylar, Arturo Capito and incumbent Vice Mayor Alfredo Pajarillo.

Incumbent Vice Mayor Alfredo Pajarillo of Partido Federal ng Pilipinas ran for Mayor.

Pila

Santa Cruz
In a bid to reclaim his old post, former Mayor Ariel Magcalas is seeking for a comeback trail as Mayor of Santa Cruz, Laguna. His opponents are former Congressman Edgar San Luis and Incumbent Board Member Joseph Kris Benjamin Agarao.

Santa Maria

Siniloan

Biñan

Calamba

References

2019 Philippine local elections
Elections in Laguna (province)
May 2019 events in the Philippines
2019 elections in Calabarzon